Hudson's canastero (Asthenes hudsoni) is a species of bird in the family Furnariidae. It is found in Argentina, Brazil, Paraguay, and Uruguay in natural temperate grasslands. It is named after Argentine-British ornithologist William Henry Hudson.

Hudson's canastero is part of a group of streaked canasteros that have drab plumages with dark stripes on dorsal parts and inhabit grassy areas. It is most closely related to the similarly-looking Austral Canastero. Hudson's canastero inhabits humid grasslands usually near marshes, including brackish marshes, and specially areas that show tall bunch grasses interspaced with short turf or bare ground.

The species forages on the ground and rarely perches on vegetation and even nests are built at the base of a grass bunch. The species is at least partially migratory. Its breeding distribution encompasses the humid pampas and a narrow strip of land along the coast of Rio Grande do Sul, Brazil. Wintering individuals can be found across a larger area in central Argentina and Uruguay, rarely reaching southern Paraguay.

References

Hudson's canastero
Birds of Argentina
Birds of the Pampas
Birds of Uruguay
Hudson's canastero
Hudson's canastero
Taxonomy articles created by Polbot